"Saving Grace" is a song by American musician Tom Petty and is the lead track on his 2006 album, Highway Companion. In July 2006, "Saving Grace" was released as the first radio single from the album. The song, as well as its B-side "Big Weekend", was released on the iTunes Store on July 4, 2006. The single received a physical release in the United Kingdom in early August 2006.

Track listings

iTunes tracks
"Saving Grace" – 3:46
"Big Weekend" – 3:15

UK single
CD W727CD
"Saving Grace" – 3:54
"Square One" (Live) – 3:46

Personnel
Tom Petty – lead vocals, background vocals, 12-string rhythm guitar, drums, piano, handclaps
Mike Campbell – slide guitar, rhythm guitar, handclaps
Jeff Lynne – bass guitar, rhythm guitar, background vocals, organ, handclaps

Chart performance
"Saving Grace" debuted the week ending July 22, 2006 on Billboard's Hot 100 chart at No. 100, the Mainstream Rock Tracks chart at No. 34, and the Pop 100 chart at No. 85. The song improved in the Mainstream Rock Tracks chart to No. 26 over the course of four weeks. It also reached #1 on the Adult Alternative Songs chart.

References

External links
Watch "Saving Grace" at TomPetty.com, 6/26/06, from Tom Petty - The Last DJ URL accessed June 29, 2006. 

2006 singles
Tom Petty songs
Song recordings produced by Jeff Lynne
Warner Records singles
2006 songs
Songs written by Tom Petty